Palmese may refer to a pair of Italian football clubs:

U.S. Palmese 1912, based in Palmi (RC), Calabria
U.S.D. Palmese, based in Palma Campania (NA), Campania